The Seyhan dace or Seyhan chub (Squalius seyhanensis) is a species of ray-finned fish in the family Cyprinidae. It is endemic to the Seyhan River in Turkey.

References

Squalius
Fish described in 2013